Coleophora gallivora is a moth of the family Coleophoridae. It is found in Turkestan and Uzbekistan.

The larvae feed on galls made by other insects (flies of the family Cecidomyiidae). They can be found on Arbuscula arbuscula, Arbuscula richteri, and Haloxylon species. They create a silky case. There are four to five not very straight stripes extending along the case, which are sometimes contiguous at the anterior and posterior ends. These stripes are the same color as the case but smoother than the space between them and discernible only under high magnification on incomplete and not fully covered cases. The valve is three-sided. The length is about 6 mm. Larvae can be found from May to the beginning of June and again from the end of September to the beginning of October in at least two generations. Fully fed larvae hibernate.

References

gallivora
Moths described in 1970
Moths of Asia